Anna Reetta Alisa Tamminen (born 30 October 1994) is a Finnish footballer who plays as a goalkeeper for Hammarby IF and the Finland women's national football team. 

She has won six caps for Finland, including appearances at the 2019 and 2020 Cyprus Women's Cup.

Club career
Born and raised in Turku, Tamminen played youth football with several local clubs. In 2015, she started her senior career with NiceFutis in the Naisten Liiga, the domestic top tier. After two seasons with the club, she moved to Hovås Billdal IF in the Swedish second division Elitettan. Tamminen appeared in all 26 league fixtures in 2017, but was unable to save her team from a relegation.

On 10 January 2018, Tamminen returned to Finland, moving to Åland United. For three consecutive years, in 2018, 2019 and 2020, Tamminen won the award of Goalkeeper of the Year in the Finnish league. In 2020, Åland United were crowned Finnish champions through winning the Kansallinen Liiga. The same year, the club also won the Finnish Women's Cup, through a 2–1 win over Tikkurilan Palloseura in the final.

On 2 December 2020, Tamminen signed a one-year contract with Hammarby IF in Damallsvenskan. She made 22 appearances in the league in 2021, leading her side to a 7th place in the table.

On 17 November 2021, Tamminen signed a new two-year deal with the club. In 2022, Tamminen made 23 appearances, as Hammarby finished 5th in the Damallsvenskan table. She kept 12 clean sheets throughout the season, the most in the whole league.

References

External links 
 
 
 

1994 births
Living people
Women's association football goalkeepers
Finnish women's footballers
Finland women's international footballers
Kansallinen Liiga players
Damallsvenskan players
Åland United players
Hammarby Fotboll (women) players
UEFA Women's Euro 2022 players
Expatriate women's footballers in Sweden
Finnish expatriate footballers
Finnish expatriate sportspeople in Sweden